Puduvai Bharathiar Grama Bank (PBGB) is a regional rural bank headquartered at Puducherry in the Union Territory of Puducherry, India. The bank is jointly owned by Central and Union territory Governments & sponsored by Indian Bank. It is under the ownership of Ministry of Finance, Government of India. It is named after the great poet Subramania Bharati to honor him.

See also

 Banking in India
 List of banks in India
 Reserve Bank of India
 Regional Rural Bank
 Indian Financial System Code
 List of largest banks
 List of companies of India
 Make in India

References

External links
 Rural banks at rbi.org.in
 List of all Grameen Banks in India at freshersplane.com
 nabard.org

Regional rural banks of India
Companies based in Puducherry
2008 establishments in Puducherry
Banks established in 2008
Indian companies established in 2008